Lake Compounce is an amusement park located in Bristol and Southington, Connecticut. Opened in 1846, it is the oldest continuously operating amusement park in the United States. It spans , which includes a beach and a water park called Crocodile Cove included in the price of admission. The park was acquired from Kennywood Entertainment Company by Palace Entertainment, the U.S. subsidiary of Parques Reunidos. In addition to the 14th oldest wooden roller coaster in the world, Wildcat, its newer wooden roller coaster, Boulder Dash, has won the Golden Ticket Award for the #1 Wooden Coaster in the World for five consecutive years.

History 

The lake's name is derived from Chief John Compound, a Mattatuck/Tunxis Native American. On December 3, 1684, his tribe signed a deed that left Compound's Lake to a group of white settlers, including John Norton, who had migrated to central Connecticut from Massachusetts. The property was left to the settlers in exchange for a small amount of money and miscellaneous items, including a large brass tea kettle. A local myth suggests that Chief Compound drowned while trying to cross the lake in the brass tea kettle.

Early days 
The park's history goes back to 1846, when Gad Norton hired a scientist to perform an experiment using explosives, which failed. The experiment brought large crowds, which inspired Norton to open an amusement park. His park had public swimming and rowing on the lake, a gazebo for lakeside band concerts and several rides. The park saw success as a picnic park through the post-American Civil War era.

In 1851, a California Gold Rush 49er named Isaac Pierce joined Norton to establish a firm. The two men petitioned local legislators that their residences be ceded from the town of Southington to the town of Bristol. In 1895, a casino was built on the property, which was the first permanent building at the site. Later that year, the Bristol and Plainville Tramway Company constructed the Southington and Compounce trolley line. Shortly after, Lake Compounce purchased the Lake Compounce Carousel for $10,000, opening it on Memorial Day, 1911. The Carousel is now included in the National Register of Historic Places.

In 1914, Lake Compounce opened the Green Dragon, the park's first electric-powered roller coaster. The coaster was torn down in 1927 to make room for the Wildcat, a wooden coaster designed by Schmeck and built by the Philadelphia Toboggan Company.

The early 1930s brought more growth. The casino was expanded with a dance floor. On Easter, Glenn Gray and the Casa Loma Band opened the Starlight Ballroom. The all-time attendance record of 5,000 was set in the spring of 1941, when Tommy Dorsey's reorganized band featured Frank Sinatra, who had yet to reach the height of his career.

The effects of the Great Depression and the popularity of the automobile brought trolleys in the United States into a decline, which negatively impacted attendance at Lake Compounce. These same factors had similar effects on other parks in the New England region, such as Canobie Lake Park and Riverside Park. In 1944, Lake Compounce opened a steam railroad. It was designed and built by Connecticut actor William Gillette, the original portrayer of Sherlock Holmes in silent films.

New ownership 
The park's success was steady until the late 1960s, when the park's attendance was decreasing. Lake Compounce remained under the ownership of the Pierce and Norton Corporation until 1966, when Edward G. Pierce sold his share to the Norton family. The Nortons owned and operated the park through 1985 and were able to restore some profitability and raise attendance. No major attractions were added during this time, and the Nortons listed the park for sale in 1984. In 1985, Lake Compounce was sold to the Hershey Entertainment and Resorts Company, owners of Hersheypark in Hershey, Pennsylvania, who briefly renamed the park to "Hershey's Lake Compounce". Factors such as poor marketing, low attendance, and repeated ride outages caused Hershey to sell the park after two seasons in 1987, a decision that upset local representatives.

In the spring of 1987, Joseph Entertainment Group, owned by Joseph Balestieri, bought the park and renamed it "Lake Compounce Festival Park". The park received renovations and in 1988 a 20,000-seat outdoor amphitheater. One of the first notable musical acts to perform at the new venue was the group Milli Vanilli, and their live performance was broadcast on MTV in what became the first public sign that they were lip-synching, when a recording of the song "Girl You Know It's True" began to skip. JEG focused on concert promotion and neglected the amusement park portion of the property. The Wildcat roller coaster and other rides became nonoperational by 1991. That year, JEG's financial troubles were exposed when a check the company wrote to Guns N' Roses bounced, and the performance was cancelled. It was later discovered that JEG was nearly $900,000 behind in taxes and had not refunded nearly $300,000 to ticket-holders for 15 cancelled concerts.

At the end of the 1991 season, Joseph Entertainment Group filed Chapter 11 bankruptcy and did not open the park for the 1992 season. The park was put up for sale at a very low price. After being unable to find a buyer, JEG filed for Chapter 7 bankruptcy protection and liquidated the park. The land and what was left of the rides and buildings was sold to a previous owner, Stephen Barberino. His plan was to hold onto the park and the few rides and buildings left and sell it to another amusement park owner. The park remained closed for the 1992 and 1993 seasons, but during both years the beach area was opened for the three days of Labor Day weekend in order to preserve the park's status as the oldest continuously operating amusement and trolley park in the United States. In 1993, Funtime Parks, which owned the now defunct Geauga Lake near Cleveland, Ohio and Darien Lake near Buffalo, NY, among other parks, became Barberino's management partner. The existing rides were repaired, some new rides were added, and waterslides were constructed for the beach and lake areas. The park reopened for the 1994 and 1995 seasons. That year Funtime merged with Premier Parks, which went on to purchase Riverside Park (now Six Flags New England) 30 miles north near Springfield, MA and owned other parks such as Great Escape in Lake George, NY. Premier Parks and Barberino then put Lake Compounce up for sale again in 1995. Companies such as Cedar Fair, Alpha Smartparks, and the Kennywood Corporation made offers.

Kennywood and Parques Reunidos 

Early in 1996, Kennywood Entertainment, owners of Pittsburgh's Kennywood amusement park, signed an agreement to purchase Lake Compounce. That year the park added a few more new rides and a Boomerang Roller Coaster which was actually purchased by previous operators. The park prospered as it was positioned as a family medium-sized amusement park rather than a thrill park. In 2000, the roller coaster Boulder Dash was opened, and later received the 2004 Golden Ticket Award for the #1 rated Wooden roller coaster by "Amusement Today." In late 2007, Kennywood Entertainment Company sold its parks to Spain-based Parques Reunidos.

Plans include a significant expansion of the Crocodile Cove water park. This has required the moving of nearby Mount Vernon Road to the north to give the park more room for expansion. The road move was expected to cost $6 million, while the additions to the water park were expected to cost $15 million. In 2013, the park added the Bayou Bay wave pool as part of its expansion plans. In 2014, the park added a campground off-site called Bear Creek Campground with cabins, tent and RV spaces, and a main lodge. The Campground was renamed to Lake Compounce Campground in 2021 as a part of the parks 175th season.

In 2016, the park added a new roller coaster called "Phobia Phear Coaster," a Sky Rocket 2 model from Premier Rides. General Manager Jerry Brick stated that the coaster was the biggest investment in the park's history.

In early July 2017, Lake Compounce shut down the "Sky Ride"—a twenty-five minute round trip chairlift from the park up to the top of the Southington Mountain ridge.  The non-ski chairlift was one of the new rides brought to the park by Kennywood Entertainment in 1997.  The decommissioning came after a chairlift accident at Six Flags Great Escape on June 24, 2017.  The remote and inaccessible nature of the lift's path and terminus on top of Southington Mountain were cited by General Manager Jerry Brick as reasons for the closing.

Events 
During October, the park runs a Halloween event. The midways are decorated, many of the park's rides are run in the dark, and a haunted house called "The Haunted Graveyard" is opened. The attraction consists of a 45-minute walk-through of catacombs, castles, special effects, and graveyards, as well as many other houses being added every year. The Haunted Graveyard started in 1991 and relocated to Lake Compounce in 2001. Portions of the proceeds are donated towards the American Diabetes Association and the Juvenile Diabetes Research Foundation.

During December, the park becomes covered in lights, becoming a Christmas experience for adults and children. There is a selection of children's and family rides open and a place to meet Santa. The event also features a 100-foot-tall Christmas tree, which is the largest in Connecticut.

Attractions

Former attractions

References

External links 

 Official website
 Haunted Graveyard official website
 

Amusement parks in Connecticut
1846 establishments in Connecticut
Tourist attractions in Hartford County, Connecticut
Buildings and structures in Bristol, Connecticut
Southington, Connecticut
Palace Entertainment
Amusement parks opened in 1846